Frankenstein Unbound is a 1990 science fiction horror film based on Brian Aldiss' 1973 novel of the same name, starring John Hurt, Raul Julia, Bridget Fonda, Jason Patric, and Nick Brimble. The film is co-written and directed by Roger Corman, returning to the director's chair after a hiatus of almost twenty years. This is his final directorial effort to date, for which he was paid $1 million to direct.

Plot
In 2031, Dr. Buchanan and his team work to develop the ultimate weapon, an energy beam that will completely remove whatever it is aimed at. Buchanan hopes he can create a weapon so powerful that it will end all war and have the added benefit of no impact on the environment. Unfortunately, the prototype has unpredictable side effects, creating erratic global weather patterns and rifts in space and time that have caused some people to vanish. As he drives home from the testing facility, Buchanan himself is caught in one such rift.

Buchanan and his futuristic computer-controlled car reappear in Switzerland in 1817. In a village, he meets Victor Frankenstein. The men discuss science over dinner and it is revealed that Frankenstein's young brother has been killed. A trial is to determine the guilt or innocence of the boy's nanny, who is suspected in the murder.

Several villagers claim to have seen a monster in the woods and suggest this is the killer. Buchanan observes the trial and becomes interested in a young woman taking notes. She turns out to be Mary Shelley, author of the Frankenstein novel. Shelley gives credence to the talk of monsters, but the judge does not. The nanny is found guilty and sentenced to die at the gallows. Buchanan knows the monster killed the child. He implores Frankenstein to come forward and reveal the truth, but Frankenstein refuses. Buchanan then asks Shelley for help, telling her that he is from the future. They are attracted to each other, but Mary, fearing to know too much about the future and her own destiny, chooses not to become involved. Buchanan is on his own. He drives his car to Frankenstein's workshop and finds the doctor in discussion with the monster.

The monster has killed Frankenstein's fiance, saying that if a mate was not made for him then he would deprive Frankenstein of his. Frankenstein asks Buchanan to use his knowledge of electricity to assist in resurrecting the dead woman. Buchanan instructs the monster to run cables to a weather vane on the roof. While the monster is distracted, Buchanan re-routes some of the electrical cables to begin powering up the prototype laser in his car.

As the lightning strikes the tower, again and again, the battery on the laser begins to charge and the corpse on the table begins to move. At the same moment, the woman is restored to life and Buchanan's energy beam is fully charged; he fires. The castle is destroyed.

But the laser opens another space-time rift, sending Buchanan, Frankenstein, and the two monsters far into the future. They land on a snowy mountain with no sign of civilization. Frankenstein and the monster both try to entice the woman to them, only to have her force Frankenstein to shoot and kill her. Enraged, the monster kills Frankenstein and trudges off into the snowstorm. Buchanan follows, hoping to kill the monster before he reaches a city and kills again.

Eventually, the monster is cornered in a cave filled with computers and machines. When Buchanan enters, the machines chirp to life and a voice says "Welcome back, Dr. Buchanan." The monster tells Buchanan that the cave is the central brain for the nearby city, the last one remaining after the world has been devastated by Buchanan's ultimate weapon. Buchanan engages security devices and the monster is burned to death by lasers. Buchanan makes his way to the nearby city through the snow.

As he walks, the monster's voice is heard saying that he cannot truly be killed, for now, he is "unbound."

Cast 
 John Hurt as Joe Buchanan / The Narrator
 Raul Julia as Dr. Victor Frankenstein
 Bridget Fonda as Mary Shelley
 Nick Brimble as Frankenstein's Monster
 Catherine Rabett as Elizabeth Lavenza
 Jason Patric as Lord Byron
 Michael Hutchence as Percy Shelley
 Catherine Corman as Justine Moritz
 Mickey Knox as General Reade
 Terri Treas as The Voice of Computer

Production
Producer Thom Mount approached Roger Corman with the idea to get him back into directing after a two decade absence. To get a strong script, Corman looked to known writers including Wes Craven and Floyd Mutrux to craft something original before ultimately having F.X. Feeney adapt Brian Aldiss' novel Frankenstein Unbound with input from Corman himself.

Reception
On the review aggregator website Rotten Tomatoes, the film has a 44% approval rating based on 16 reviews, with an average rating of 5.10/10. Vincent Canby of The New York Times wrote "The movie ... looks fine, and the performers are mostly good. ... Mr. Brimble's Monster looks the way Alexander Godunov might look after a failed face-lift. The special effects are nicely spaced out, and the laugh lines fairly funny."

It performed poorly at the box office, grossing nearly $335,000. According to Brian Aldiss he went to see the film in a cinema in Leicester Square and there were only 6 other people in the audience.

Locations
This feature was filmed in Italy, including in Milan and around Bellagio.

See also

 List of films featuring Frankenstein's monster

References

External links 

1990 films
1990 horror films
1990 science fiction films
1990s American films
1990s English-language films
1990s science fiction horror films
20th Century Fox films
American science fiction horror films
Films about time travel
Films based on British horror novels
Films directed by Roger Corman
Films produced by Roger Corman
Films scored by Carl Davis
Films set in the 1810s
Films set in 2031
Films set in Switzerland
Films shot in Milan
Frankenstein films
Trimark Pictures films